The Wiradhuric languages or Central (Inland) New South Wales, are a family of Pama–Nyungan languages of Australia. There are three languages:
Gamilaraay (northeast)
Wiradhuri–Ngiyambaa
Wiradhuri (south)
Ngiyambaa (west)
All are now moribund.

Wiradhuri and Ngiyambaa appear to be more closely related to each other than to Gamilaraay, as they show some common features that Gamilaraay lacks. The languages are close enough to be accepted as related in the conservative classification of Dixon (2002). Bowern (2011) lists the Yuwaaliyaay and Yuwaalaraay varieties of Gamilaraay as separate languages. Bigambal may have been another, if it wasn't one of the Banjalung languages.  The Gujambal language has been listed as Wiradhuric, but is undocumented.

Comparison

See also
Central New South Wales languages

References